{{DISPLAYTITLE:C6H16N2}}
The molecular formula C6H16N2 (molar mass: 116.21 g/mol, exact mass: 116.1313 u) may refer to:

 Hexamethylenediamine
 Tetramethylethylenediamine (TMEDA or TEMED)